Joseph P. "Joe" Carson, mainly referred to as Uncle Joe, is a main fictional character on the CBS sitcom, Petticoat Junction (1963–1970). Uncle Joe is the only character in the series to appear in all 222 episodes. He is portrayed by Edgar Buchanan, who is described as "absolutely perfect in the role,"  and "the perfect choice to play the loveable codger."

Fictional background
In the sitcom, Joe is portrayed as an aging bachelor who had a lack of marriage. He lives at the Shady Rest Hotel with his niece, Kate Bradley (played by actress Bea Benaderet) and her daughters (his great-nieces) Billie Jo Bradley, Bobbie Jo Bradley, and Betty Jo Bradley. Although he is the self-described "Manager" of the hotel, Kate is depicted as the genuine owner who does far more work than he does. 

Joe is represented as a lazy character who complains "My lumbago!" whenever there's heavy lifting or hard work to be done. His character frequently creates work-saving devices, such as a clothesline pulley system to bring luggage back and forth from the hotel to the train. Joe's favorite place to spend time in the show is in a rocking char on the front porch of the Shady Rest Hotel; he is also frequently shown napping on the sofa in the lobby. Joe's character often teases Hooterville Cannonball engineer Charley Pratt (played by actor Rufe Davis) about his weight, despite Joe being pleasantly plump himself.

Joe's character frequently comes up with get-rich-quick schemes and ill-conceived hotel promotional ideas. In one episode, he buys a goat whose milk is supposed to cure baldness. In another episode, he turns the Shady Rest into a weight-loss camp. He even buys a buffalo in order to lure wealthy British hunters to the hotel. Uncle Joe's character often enlists Billie Jo, Bobbie Jo, and Betty Jo to assit with his schemes, much to Kate's chagrin. Despite the fact that he is lazy and dodges Kate when she asks him to do something, Joe's character is loved dearly by his family and the citizens of Hooterville.

In the show, Uncle Joe is the Chief of the Hooterville Volunteer Fire Department and the conductor of the Hooterville Volunteer Fire Department Band. Upon the departure of Kate early in season six, Joe becomes the overseer of the Shady Rest Hotel. However, it is never stated why he takes on this responsibility, because, in the show's storyline, Kate is only depicted as being away on a trip.

Green Acres
Joe's character appears in 17 episodes of the Petticoat Junction's spin-off, Green Acres (the second-most number of guest appearances of any Petticoat Junction character after Sam Drucker). In Green Acres, Joe's character develops a crush on the main character Oliver Douglas' mother who finds him to be very annoying.

References

Petticoat Junction characters